Sanjay Kumar Das Burma (Odia: ସଞ୍ଜୟ କୁମାର ଦାସ ବର୍ମା ; born on 6 July 1966) is a politician from Odisha, India. he was the Minister of State(Ind), Food Supplies and Consumer Welfare and Minister of State(Ind), Employment & Technical Education & Training in Odisha Legislative Assembly. He is a two time MLA representing Brahmagiri constituency from the Biju Janata Dal party. He is the executive editor of Odia Magazine "SISIRA".

Personal background 
Sanjay Kumar DasBurma is the son of Late Rama Krishna Das, born in Malud, Krishnaprasad, Puri. He is married to Sailabala DasBurma. The couple have a son named Achin Dasburma and a daughter Dipali Dasburma.

Political career 
He was first elected as a MLA in 2009 from Brahmagiri Vidhan Sabha constituency in the 14th Odisha legislative assembly defeating veteran INC leader Late Lalatendu Bidyadhar Mohapatra. 

He is a minister of state (Independent Charge) with two portfolios in the ongoing 15th Odisha legislative assembly.

He has also served as the secretary, convener, vice president of BJD and the president of Biju Yuva Janata dal (BYJD), the youth wing of the party.

See also 
 Parikud

References

External links
 sanjaydasburma.in

1966 births
Living people
Members of the Odisha Legislative Assembly
Biju Janata Dal politicians